Goyette is a French Canadian surname that may refer to

Alex Goyette (born 1988), American film director, writer, producer, actor, and YouTube personality 
Charles Goyette, American radio host
Cynthia Goyette (born 1946), American swimmer 
Danielle Goyette (born 1966), Canadian ice hockey player 
Desirée Goyette (born 1956), American singer, composer, lyricist and voice-over artist 
Kalamity (born Maggy Goyette), French Canadian professional wrestler
Louis Béland-Goyette (born 1995), Canadian association football player 
Odilon Goyette (1842–1921), Canadian farmer and political figure 
Phil Goyette (born 1933), Canadian ice hockey center 
Sophie Goyette, Canadian film director and screenwriter 
Susan Goyette (born 1964), Canadian poet and novelist

French-language surnames